WICOR is a collection of instructional strategies associated with the AVID program. It is the foundation of AVID secondary curriculum. WICOR stands for writing, inquiry, collaboration, organization and reading.

References

Pedagogy